Alison Magaya (died 24 August 2015) was a South Sudanese politician and diplomat. He served as Interior Minister up until 2013, before being named the South Sudanese ambassador to Switzerland. Magaya died in Geneva, Switzerland on 24 August 2015 after a brief undisclosed illness.

See also
 Ministry of Internal Affairs (South Sudan)
 Cabinet of South Sudan

References

Government ministers of South Sudan
2015 deaths
Year of birth missing
South Sudanese expatriates in Switzerland